Bellido is a Spanish surname. It was originally a nickname for someone handsome, from the Spanish bellido. It has also been used as a given name in the past. Notable people with surname include:
José Antonio Dammert Bellido (1917–2008), Peruvian bishop
Rubén Blades; full name Rubén Blades Bellido de Luna (born 1948), Panamanian singer
Gerónimo Giménez; full name Gerónimo Giménez y Bellido (1854–1923), Spanish conductor and composer
María Parado de Bellido (1777–1822), indigenous Peruvian revolutionary
Ximena Bellido (born 1966), Peruvian badminton player
Guido Bellido (born 1979), Prime minister of Peru

References

Spanish-language surnames